Kim M. Blankenship is an American sociologist and HIV/AIDS researcher. She is a professor at the American University College of Arts and Sciences and the director of the Social and Behavioral Sciences Core of the District of Columbia Center for AIDS Research.

Education 
Blankenship completed a bachelor of arts in sociology at College of William & Mary. She earned a master of arts and Ph.D. in sociology at Duke University.

Career and research 
At Yale University, Blankenship was the associate director of the center for interdisciplinary research on AIDS from 1998 to 2008. From 2008 to 2010, she worked at the Duke Global Health Institute and was a member of the sociology faculty at Duke University. She is a professor of sociology at American University College of Arts and Sciences and the director of the Social and Behavioral Sciences Core of the District of Columbia Center for AIDS Research.

Blankenship researches structural interventions and social determinants of health. She explores the implementation and impact of community mobilization in HIV prevention.

References

External links

Living people
Year of birth missing (living people)
American women social scientists
American sociologists
American women sociologists
21st-century social scientists
21st-century American women scientists
College of William & Mary alumni
Duke University alumni
Duke University faculty
Yale University faculty
American University faculty and staff
HIV/AIDS researchers